Robert Alan 'Bob' Knuth (born May 15, 1967) is an American scenic designer and creative director based in the Chicago, Illinois area. Knuth was the Creative Director of Marketing & Brand for The Second City Inc (Chicago, Hollywood, Toronto) and UP Comedy Club in Chicago from 2005 to 2021. During the pandemic, Knuth pivoted his career to focus on design and education. In August of 2021, Knuth took a position as the Resident Set & Light Designer/Theater Technical Director for Lake Forest College in Lake Forest, Illinois just north of Chicago. Knuth has been nominated for 15 Joseph Jefferson Awards and is a two (2) time award winner for outstanding scenic design.

In 2004, Chris Jones, Chief Theater Critic for The Chicago Tribune wrote about Knuth's body of work in Chicago storefront theaters, "Perhaps more than any other set designer working in the Chicago area, Knuth has solved the aesthetic problems inherent in the prosaic, end-on storefront where audience members sit in narrow rows and stare over the backs of heads at a rectangular stage without much depth or height. Normally, that's as constraining as trying to build a postmodern dwelling on a single Chicago lot. But as Knuth proves again in his very bold, striking and endlessly inventive production of "Jane Eyre" (the talented fellow directs as well as designs), it does not have to be that way."

Biography 
After attending undergraduate school at the University of Wisconsin - Eau Claire (1985-1990) and completing two years of graduate studies in Design for the Theatre at Northwestern University (1990-1992), Knuth began his career as the Managing Artistic Director for CenterLight Sign and Voice Theatre in Northbrook, Illinois, in 1993.

Knuth was the Senior Graphic Designer at The Chicago Symphony Orchestra from 1998-2005.

Besides working as a freelance scenic and graphic designer, Knuth was Producing Director and resident Scenic/Graphic Designer for Circle Theatre Chicago in Forest Park from 2001-2013 before stepping down to pursue freelance work and focus on his career at The Second City.

During his tenure as Producing Director, Circle Theatre had hosted visits from many notable entertainment luminaries (Rupert Holmes, Michael John LaChiusa, Marvin Hamlisch, Russell Crowe), mounted World and Chicago Premieres and built a thriving subscriber base.

Other scenic design credits include Mercury Theatre Chicago's productions of Clue - The Play, The Addams Family (2015 JEFF Award for Outstanding Musical Production)  and The Color Purple. The Second City's mainstage productions of Let Them Eat Chaos, Depraved New World Panic on Cloud 9 and for The Second City's E.T.C. 39th Revue. Fox Valley Rep's (formally Noble Fool Theatre at Pheasant Run Resort) Let's Misbehave, Breaking Up is Hard To Do, The 25th Annual Putnam County Spelling Bee, and The Mystery of Edwin Drood.

In the fall of 2022, Knuth was the lead interior designer for the reopening of the historic iO Theater comedy complex, overseeing the extensive renovations to the facade, two bars, offices, training center classrooms, and four theaters.

Other awards 
In 2003, Knuth was also nominated for a Joseph Jefferson Award for Outstanding Direction of a Musical for The Secret Garden. "The Secret Garden" was nominated for a total 10 Jeff Awards that season and won for Outstanding Production - Musical, and three additional awards including Actress In A Supporting Role (Sarah Swanson),  Choreography (Kevin Bellie), Costumes (Jeffrey Kelly).

In 2015 and 2017, Knuth received In-House Design Merit Awards from HOW Design Magazine for poster designs promoting the 103rd and 104th mainstage revues at The Second City.

References

1967 births
Living people
American scenic designers
American art directors
University of Wisconsin–Eau Claire alumni
Northwestern University alumni